The Guarani alphabet (achegety) is used to write the Guarani language, spoken mostly in Paraguay and nearby countries. It consists of 33 letters.

Orthography

Their respective names are:

a, ã, che, e, ẽ, ge, g̃e, he, i, ĩ, je, ke, le, me, mbe, ne, nde, nge, nte, ñe, o, õ, pe, re, rre, se, te, u, ũ, ve, y, ỹ, puso.

Description 
The six letters A, E, I, O, U, Y denote vowel sounds, the same as in Spanish, except that Y is a high central vowel, . The vowel variants with a tilde are nasalized. (Older books used diaereses or circumflexes to mark nasalization.) All the other letters (including Ñ, G̃, and the digraphs) are consonants, pronounced for the most part as in Spanish.

The Latin letters B, C, D are used only as parts of digraphs, while F, Q, W, X, Z are not used at all. The letter L and the digraph  are only used in words adopted from Spanish, words influenced by Spanish phonology, or non-verbal onomatopoeias. The Spanish  digraph is not used in Guarani.

Despite its spelling, the  digraph is not the Spanish affricate sound  (English "ch" as in "teach"), but a fricative  (English "sh" as in ship, French "ch" as in chapeau).  Occasionally,  is written for this sound, following Portuguese and medieval Spanish usage.

"G" is the voiced velar spirant , as in Spanish haga; it is not a plosive as in English gate.

"V" is the English and French voiced labiodental  fricative , as in Victor, not the Spanish bilabial.  It is also pronounced as the labiodental approximant , which is like  with the lower lip touching the upper teeth.

For some speakers,  freely varies with the Spanish , like the "J" in José.

The tilde'ed versions of E, I, U, Y, and G are not available in ISO Latin-1 fonts, but can be represented in Unicode (except that tilded "G" is not available as a single precomposed letter, and must be encoded as a plain "G" plus a combining tilde). In digital environments where those glyphs are not available, the tilde is often postfixed to the base character ("E~", "I~", "U~", "Y~", "G~") or a circumflex is used instead ("Ê", "Î", "Û", "Ŷ", "Ĝ").

The acute accent "´" is used to indicate the stress (muanduhe), as in áva  ("hair") and  tái  ("peppery").  When omitted, the stress falls on a nasalized vowel, or, if none, on the last syllable, as in syva  ("forehead") and tata  ("fire").

History 
Up to the Spanish Conquest of the Americas in the 15th century, the Guaraní people did not have a writing system. The first written texts in Guaraní were produced by Jesuit missionaries, using the Latin script. The priest Antonio Ruíz de Montoya documented the language in his works Tesoro de la lengua guaraní (a Guarani-Spanish dictionary, printed in 1639) and Arte y bocabvlario de la lengua guaraní (a grammar compendium and dictionary, printed in 1722) among others.

The alphabet and spelling used in those early books were somewhat inconsistent and substantially different from the modern ones. In 1867, Mariscal Francisco Solano López, president of Paraguay, convened a Script Council to regulate the writing, but the effort was not successful.

The orthography was finally standardized in its present form in 1950, at the Guarani Language Congress in Montevideo, by initiative of Reinaldo Decoud Larrosa.  The standards was influenced by the International Phonetic Alphabet notation, and it is now universally used in Paraguay.

Nonetheless, there is still some disagreement between literates on details of the standard.

The Guarani name for the alphabet, is a neologism formed from a-che-ge (the names of the first three letters) and ty meaning "grouping", "ensemble".

Toponyms and proper names 
There are many toponyms and some proper names derived from Guarani in Argentina, Uruguay, Paraguay, and Brazil. These are usually written according to the Spanish and Portuguese systems, and their pronunciation has often changed considerably over the centuries, to the point that they may no longer be understood by modern Guarani speakers.

See also 
 Guarani Braille

References

External links 
Comparing old and new orthographies

Latin alphabets
Guarani languages